A water stop is a railway stop where a steam locomotive can take on water.

Water stop or waterstop may also refer to:

Waterstop, a watertight structure
Water stop (sports) or water break, a break and a place to break for drinking water in some sports competitions
"Waterstop" or Waterhouse stop was an early interchangeable aperture diaphragm 
"Water Stop", a song from the Gut the Van album
"Water Stop", a song from the Silent Steeples album